Wagaman was an electoral division of the Legislative Assembly in Australia's Northern Territory. It existed from 1983 to 1987 and was named after the Darwin suburb of Wagaman.

Members for Wagaman

Election results

Elections in the 1980s

References

Former electoral divisions of the Northern Territory